Samsung has a long history of designing and producing system-on-chips (SoCs) and has been manufacturing SoCs for its own devices as well as for sale to other manufacturers. The first Samsung SoC, the S3C44B0, was built around an ARM7 CPU which operated at 66 MHz clock frequency. Later, several SoCs (S3C2xxx) containing an ARM9 CPU were produced. For more information on Samsung's current SoCs see Exynos.

List of historical Samsung SoCs

References

Lists of computer hardware
System on a chip